In linguistics, discourse analysis, and related fields, an interlocutor is a person involved in a conversation or dialogue. Two or more people speaking to one another are each other's interlocutors.  The terms conversation partner, hearer, or addressee are often used interchangeably with interlocutor.

According to Paul Grice, the behavior of interlocutors in ordinary conversation is governed by the cooperative principle.

See also

Addressee honorific
Clusivity
Common ground (linguistics)
Conversation analysis
Discourse

References

Linguistics
Pragmatics